Isaac Carpenter (born August 29, 1979) is an American musician, producer, and audio engineer. He is best known as the former drummer for the alternative rock group Gosling as well as its previous incarnation Loudermilk. Currently, Carpenter is the drummer for Awolnation.  He previously played with Duff McKagan's Loaded as well as Adam Lambert's live band and he has performed and/or recorded with The Exies, Ours, Seaspin, Black Lab, Marion Raven, Tyga and Unified Theory among others.

Biography

Loudermilk & Gosling (1995–2006)

In 1995, friends Davey Ingersoll (vocals, guitar), Mark Watrous (guitar), Shane Middleton (bass) and Carpenter formed the hard rock quartet Loudermilk in the Tri-Cities of Washington. Initially formed as a Guns N' Roses cover band, with the name .22s and Tulips, in high school, they released their own independent album, Man with Gun Kills Three! in 1998. American Recordings heard a demo of theirs and subsequently signed them.  However, despite touring with famous bands such as Mötley Crüe and Megadeth, they were dropped from the label. DreamWorks Records signed them in early 2002. Several months later, they recorded and released their first official major label album, The Red Record.

The group later changed their name to Gosling, after changing their musical style, retaining all members with Watrous switching from guitar to keyboards. Influenced by the likes of Sunny Day Real Estate, The Smashing Pumpkins, Pink Floyd and Queen, they released the Gosling EP through The Control Group in August 2004. Earlier in the year, they supported Velvet Revolver at The Roxy Theatre in West Hollywood, California. They released their debut full-length Here Is... in 2006 through V2 and went on to tour with Rose Hill Drive.

A cover of David Bowie's "Cat People (Putting Out Fire)" was included on the soundtrack to the film Underworld: Evolution in 2006.

The Exies (2007–08)

In 2006, The Exies announced that they were to return to the studio to record a new album with Carpenter joining the group to perform drums on the album. The result was A Modern Way of Living with the Truth, produced by James Michael, released by the band's new label Eleven Seven. Carpenter toured with the group for a month before departing.

Loaded (2009–present)

In September 2009, drummer Geoff Reading announced his departure from Loaded and at the same time he informed everyone that his replacement was Carpenter:

Carpenter performed with the group on their tour supporting Black Stone Cherry, during their tour of Europe, UK and Ireland that had been announced in June.

On December 2, McKagan announced via his Twitter that he and the band were jamming on some new material. while guitarist Mike Squires stated in an online interview, on December 6, that the band were hoping to record a new album and to be touring and supporting it in 2010.

On February 1, 2010, it was announced, via Blabbermouth.net, that the group had parted ways with label Century Media and were now looking for a new label having already written and demoed new material.

On July 4, 2010, the band announced they were to begin pre-production and enter the studio in August to record the follow-up to Sick stating:

In August, it was announced that the group were to record their new album with producer Terry Date, whose production credits include albums by Soundgarden, Pantera and Deftones among others. On September 2, it was announced that the album was completed and that the group were looking for a label. McKagan also stated that it was Date that approached the group about producing their new album.

Adam Lambert (2010–12)

On September 18, 2010, Carpenter joined the touring band for Adam Lambert's Glam Nation Tour, replacing previous drummer Longineu W. Parsons III who has since returned to previous group Yellowcard. He performed dates in the US as well as Europe, Asia and Australia from September through to December 2010. As of August/September 2012, Carpenter no longer plays drums for Adam Lambert.

Touring with Awolnation (2014–present)

Isaac began touring with alternative rock band Awolnation during their UK summer tour in 2014. He also recorded drums for tracks on Awolnation's sophomore album, Run.

Discography

Production & engineering credits

References

External links

Isaac Carpenter on Myspace
Loaded on Myspace
Loaded official site

Living people
People from Tri-Cities, Washington
Musicians from Washington (state)
American rock drummers
Loaded (band) members
1979 births
Awolnation members
20th-century American drummers
American male drummers
Black Lab members
21st-century American drummers
20th-century American male musicians
21st-century American male musicians
The Exies members